"Only in America" is a song recorded by American country music duo Brooks & Dunn.  It was released in June 2001 as the second single from the  album Steers & Stripes. Kix Brooks, one-half of the duo, co-wrote the song with Don Cook and Ronnie Rogers.  "Only in America" was also the second of three consecutive Number One hits from that album, reaching its peak on the Billboard Hot Country Singles & Tracks (now Hot Country Songs) charts for the week of October 27, 2001.

Content
"Only in America" is an up-tempo in the keys of E and F major (the song transposes upward before the final chorus), accompanied largely by electric guitar. Its lyrics outline the lives of various people across the United States — a school bus driver and her bus full of children in the first verse, and a pair of newlyweds (a 'welder's son and a banker's daughter') in their limousine in the second verse — before observing in the chorus that "only in America" do such people "get to dream as big as [they] want to".

Critical reception
Although the song was recorded and released less than three months before the September 11, 2001 terrorist attacks, Brooks feels that the song got grouped in with other, similarly patriotic songs which were released in response to the attacks. The song was also featured in the beginning of the Oliver Stone film World Trade Center. Rolling Stone reviewer Andrew Dansby described the song was an "advertisement waiting to happen". Chris Neal of Country Weekly called the song a "flag-waving opener" to Steers & Stripes, but nonetheless made note of the song's "rock-solid riff".

The song has been used extensively in campaigns for both political parties. It was used frequently during president George W. Bush's 2004 re-election campaign. John Kerry also had it played at the Democratic National Convention in 2004. The song also played when Obama announced Joe Biden as his vice president in Springfield, Illinois in 2008. It was also featured after Democratic presidential candidate Barack Obama's acceptance speech in Denver on August 28, 2008 and has been used at campaign events in Obama's 2012 reelection campaign. "Only in America" has been used often in campaign events for Newt Gingrich in his bid to receive the 2012 Republican Presidential Nomination. Scott Walker (R-WI) also used the song after his first speech when he survived a gubernatorial recall on June 5, 2012. Mitt Romney also uses the song in many of his political rallies. When Ted Cruz dropped out of the 2016 primaries, he closed his announcement with this song. Towards the end of the 2016 election, Republican nominee Donald Trump used the song for various rallies.

"Only in America" was the first song to be heard on KKGO in Los Angeles when that station launched its current country music format on February 26, 2007.

Chart positions
"Only in America" debuted at number 54 on the U.S. Billboard Hot Country Singles & Tracks chart for the week of June 23, 2001.

Year-end charts

Parodies
American country music parody artist Cledus T. Judd released a parody of "Only in America" titled "Don't Mess With America" on his  2002 album Cledus Envy.

References

2001 singles
2001 songs
Brooks & Dunn songs
Songs about the United States
American patriotic songs
Songs written by Kix Brooks
Songs written by Ronnie Rogers
Songs written by Don Cook
Arista Nashville singles
Song recordings produced by Mark Wright (record producer)